Werner Freyberg (29 July 1902 – 15 January 1973) was a German field hockey player who competed in the 1928 Summer Olympics. He was a member of the German field hockey team, which won the bronze medal. He played two matches as halfback.

External links
 
Werner Freyberg's profile at databaseOlympics
Werner Freyberg's profile at Sports Reference.com

1902 births
1973 deaths
Field hockey players at the 1928 Summer Olympics
German male field hockey players
Olympic bronze medalists for Germany
Olympic field hockey players of Germany
Olympic medalists in field hockey
Medalists at the 1928 Summer Olympics
20th-century German people